The South Saskatchewan Regiment was an infantry regiment of the Canadian Forces formed in 1936 by the amalgamation of The Weyburn Regiment and The Saskatchewan Border Regiment. It was reduced to nil strength and placed on the Supplementary Order of Battle (i.e., virtually disbanded) in 1968. They participated in the 1942 Dieppe Raid.

History 

The regiment traces its lineage to July 3, 1905, when an infantry regiment was authorized in the District of Assiniboia and the District of Saskatchewan, which later that year became the province of Saskatchewan. The regiment was eventually organized as the 95th Saskatchewan Rifles, in Regina. After the First World War the 95th merged with the 60th Rifles of Canada (in Moose Jaw) to become the South Saskatchewan Regiment, which expanded to five battalions with the creation of units in Weyburn (3rd Battalion), Moosomin (4th Battalion) and Estevan (5th Battalion).

In 1924, each of the battalions became a distinct regiment, and the name "South Saskatchewan Regiment" went out of use. In the 1936 reorganization of the Militia, The Weyburn Regiment and The Saskatchewan Border Regiment (in Estevan) re-amalgamated into a new South Saskatchewan Regiment.

During the Second World War, The South Saskatchewan Regiment participated in many major Canadian battles and operations, as part of the 2nd Canadian Infantry Division. The South Saskatchewan Regiment fought in the Dieppe Raid of 1942, Operation Atlantic, Operation Spring, Operation Totalize, Operation Tractable, and the recapture of Dieppe in 1944. They, along with the 8th Reconnaissance Regiment liberated the Westerbork transit camp on 12 April 1945.

During the Dieppe Raid they also undertook one of the more unusual missions of the war. They provided a bodyguard for an RAF radar expert, Jack Nissenthall, who had volunteered to try penetrate a German radar station on a cliff above "Green Beach". Because Nissenthall knew the secrets of British and US radar technology, he was awarded a personal bodyguard of South Saskatchewan sharpshooters. Their orders were to protect him, but in the event of possible capture to kill him. He survived and his action enabled vital information on the state of development of the German radar to be discovered. The full story, along with graphic, first-hand descriptions of the South Saskatchewan Regiment's actions during the raid are told in James Leasor's book, "Green Beach". 

After the regiment was placed on the Supplementary Order of Battle in 1968, the queen's and regimental colours were deposited at Estevan Comprehensive School in 1969.

Lineage

Perpetuations 

 152nd Battalion (Weyburn-Estevan), CEF

Battle Honours 
The regiment possesses the following battle honours:

First World War

Second World War

Alliances 

The regiment was formerly allied with these regiments, but these alliances automatically expired when the British regiments amalgamated with other regiments.
  - The Royal Warwickshire Fusiliers
  - The King's Own Royal Border Regiment.

Notable members 

 Charles Cecil Ingersoll Merritt 
 Joseph Gregory

Music 
"We're the boys of the S.S.R." words by Isabel McCrae Parker and music by Arthur Clare Parker was published in Weyburn, Saskatchewan by A.C. Parker, circa 1939 and was dedicated to the officers and men of the South Saskatchewan Regiment. First line: "We're the boys who have gathered from near and far".

Media

Literature

References

Notes

Citations

South Saskatchewan Regiment
Military units and formations of Saskatchewan
Infantry regiments of Canada in World War II
Military units and formations established in 1936
Military units and formations disestablished in 1968
Estevan
Supplementary Order of Battle